A domino is a tile used in a family of games called "dominoes".

Domino(es) may also refer to:

Places
 Domino, Texas, town in Cass County
 Domino, Newfoundland and Labrador, a community on Island of Ponds

People
 Dominó, Brazilian boy band
 Domino (producer) (born 1970), producer and member of the band Hieroglyphics
 Domino (professional wrestler), stage name of Cliff Compton
 Domino (rapper) (born 1972), American rapper
 Domino, stage name of Alessandra Mirka Gatti (born 1969), Italian Eurobeat singer
 Domino, former stage name of Sofia Coppola (born 1971), film director and actor
 Anna Domino, folk singer-songwriter
 Fats Domino (1928–2017), R&B singer and songwriter
 Domino Harvey (1969–2005), bounty hunter, model, and daughter of actor Laurence Harvey
 Domino Kirke, English-American singer

Animals
 Domino (horse) (1891–1897), American thoroughbred race horse
 Domino or Threespot dascyllus, a marine fish

Art, entertainment, and media

Fictional entities
 Domino (character), a Marvel Comics character in X-Force
 Domino, a Dalmatian puppy with black ears with rows of white spots in 102 Dalmatians
 Domino, a vehicle which is part of Team Knight Rider (voiced by Nia Vardalos)
 Domino Vitali, character in the James Bond novel Thunderball

Film and television
 Domino (1943 film), a French film starring Fernand Gravey and Simone Renant
 Domino (1988 film), an Italian film starring Brigitte Nielsen
 Domino (2005 film), an American action film starring Keira Knightley based on the life of Domino Harvey
 Domino (2019 film), an American crime thriller film directed by Brian De Palma and starring Nikolaj Coster-Waldau, Carice van Houten & Guy Pearce
Domino (TV series), an Armenian sitcom

Games and related competitions
 Domino (card game), a shedding game involving laying cards off against a starter card.
 Domino Day, a world record attempt for the highest number of falling dominoes
 Dominos (video game), a 1977 arcade game by Atari

Music

Groups
 Billy Ward and the Dominoes, a vocal group that included Clyde McPhatter and Jackie Wilson
 Derek and the Dominos, a band from the early '70s with Eric Clapton as a member

Recording companies
 Domino Recording Company, known as Domino, based in London
Domino Records (1916) produced vertical-cut records from 1916 to 1917
Domino Records (1924), a dime-store label produced from 1924 to 1934
Domino Records (1957), a record label from Austin, Texas

Albums
 Domino (Domino album), 1993
 Domino (Rahsaan Roland Kirk album), 1962
 Domino (Squeeze album), 1998

Songs
 "Domino" (1950 song), with music by Louis Ferrari and lyrics by Jacques Plante (French) and Don Raye (English)
 "Domino" (Van Morrison song), 1970
 "Domino" (Genesis song), 1986
 "Domino" (Kiss song), 1992
 "Domino" (Jessie J song), 2011
 "Domino" (4Minute song), from Name Is 4Minute, 2013
 "Domino" (Saara Aalto song), 2018
 "Domino", by Wooseok from 9801, 2019
 "Domino", by Stray Kids from Noeasy, 2021
 "Domino", by Seventeen from Face the Sun, 2022
 "Dominoes" (Robbie Nevil song), 1986
 "Dominoes", by Syd Barrett from Barrett, 1970
 "Dominoes", by Paul McCartney from Egypt Station, 2018
 "Dominoes", by Jess Wright featuring Mann, 2013
 "Dominoes", by Mumzy Stranger, 2018
 "Dominoes", by Lorde from Solar Power, 2021
 "Dominos" (song), by The Big Pink from A Brief History of Love, 2009
 "Dominos", by Peter Bjorn and John from Breakin' Point, 2016
 "Dominos", by Last Dinosaurs from Yumeno Garden, 2018

Publications
 Domino (magazine), a magazine focused on shopping for the home
 Dominoes, a collection of stories by Bali Rai

Brands and enterprises
 Dominó (Chile), Chilean fast-food restaurant chain
 Domino Foods, sugar refining company founded by Henry Osborne Havemeyer
 Domino Printing Sciences, British-based developer of ink jet and laser printing solutions
 Domino's Pizza, an international pizza restaurant chain
 Domino (cookie), a Finnish brand of cookies similar to Oreo or Hydrox

Computing, mathematics, and technology
 Domino (mathematics), the polyomino of order two
 Domino computer, a computer based on sequences of falling dominoes
 Domino logic, a logic technique used in many modern integrated circuits
 Domino Tiles, a Unicode block containing symbols for the standard six dot domino tile set
 IBM Lotus Domino, the server element to the Lotus Notes client-server package

Transportation
 Daihatsu Domino, European name for the Daihatsu Mira car
 Domino 55, Domino 67, or Domino 69, series of railway signal boxes developed by Integra Signum
Dennis Domino, a British city bus

Other uses
 Benedicamus Domino, a closing salutation used in the Roman Mass
 Domino effect
 Domino joiner, a woodworking mortise and tenon joining tool
 Domino mask, a partial mask that covers the eyes
 Domino theory, a political theory
 Domino toppling, the activity of standing up dominoes and then triggering the first one in line to create a chain reaction
 LP Domino, a Slovak football team playing in 3. liga (Slovak Third League)

See also
Dominus (disambiguation)